Szarvas is a district in western part of Békés County. Szarvas is also the name of the town where the district seat is found. The district is located in the Southern Great Plain Statistical Region.

Geography 
Szarvas District borders with Mezőtúr District (Jász-Nagykun-Szolnok County) to the north, Gyomaendrőd District to the northeast, Békés District to the east, Békéscsaba District to the southeast, Orosháza District and Szentes District (Csongrád County) to the south, Kunszentmárton District (Jász-Nagykun-Szolnok County) to the west. The number of the inhabited places in Szarvas District is 6.

Municipalities 
The district has 2 towns, 2 large villages and 2 villages.
(ordered by population, as of 1 January 2012)

The bolded municipalities are cities, italics municipalities are large villages.

Demographics

In 2011, it had a population of 28,779 and the population density was 59/km².

Ethnicity
Besides the Hungarian majority, the main minorities are the Slovak (approx. 3,000), Roma (500), German and Romanian (100).

Total population (2011 census): 28,779
Ethnic groups (2011 census): Identified themselves: 28,588 persons:
Hungarians: 24,801 (86.75%)
Slovaks: 2,820 (9.86%)
Gypsies: 514 (1.80%)
Others and indefinable: 453 (1.58%)
Approx. 200 persons in Szarvas District did not declare their ethnic group at the 2011 census.

Religion
Religious adherence in the county according to 2011 census:

Evangelical – 7,523;
Catholic – 5,510 (Roman Catholic – 5,463; Greek Catholic – 47);
Reformed – 1,191;
other religions – 338; 
Non-religious – 6,860; 
Atheism – 278;
Undeclared – 7,079.

Gallery

See also
List of cities and towns of Hungary

References

External links
 Postal codes of the Szarvas District

Districts in Békés County